There are at least 6 named lakes and reservoirs in Johnson County, Arkansas.

Lakes
	Hartman Lake, el.

Reservoirs
	Harris Pond, el.  
	Horsehead Lake, el.  
	Lake Ludwig, el.  
	Lake Dardanelle, el.  
	Lake Ozone, el.

See also

 List of lakes in Arkansas

Notes

Bodies of water of Johnson County, Arkansas
Johnson